In 2011, Rustavi Steel LLC was established to acquire the assets of the Rustavi Metallurgical Plant. Rustavi Metallurgical Plant, one of Georgia’s largest industrial enterprises, is situated 30 kilometres to the south of Georgia's capital Tbilisi.

The Rustavi Metallurgical Plant was founded in 1948 as the first fully integrated metallurgical complex in the South Caucasus and produced steel, hot-rolled seamless pipes and various products made of pig iron, aluminium or iron. The Plant produced seamless pipes to meet the requirements of the oil fields of Kazakhstan, Azerbaijan, Turkmenistan and the Middle East.

Today, the Plant's new management and owners are embarking on a major program of investment and re-structuring to re-establish the company in regional markets, and expand into new global markets.

The Plant is manufacturing reinforcing bars, seamless pipes, square billets, pig-iron castings, metal constructions, mechanical parts, shaped castings, granulated slag, silicon-manganese, lime and limestone.

To strengthen its market position, management's first task is to increase the Plant's production capacity. A systematic modernization and re-equipment program is underway, new technologies are being introduced, training of young employees with the help of experienced professionals, has been given priority.

The Plant currently exports to the European Union, United States, and Middle Eastern markets as well as to Armenia, Azerbaijan and Turkey.

Ownership
The Rustavi Metallurgical Plant was acquired by Georgian businessman Badri Patarkatsishvili via auction in 2005 for $35.5m and was managed by Badri Patarkatsishvili with the assistance of his employee and distant relative, Joseph Kay. Following Badri's death in February 2008, Kay attempted to misappropriate various assets that belonged to Badri's widow, Inna Gudavadze and her family, including the Rustavi Steel plant, using a falsified will.

Under the government of Mikheil Saakashvili, Kay was able to obtain a judgement at the Tbilisi court that prevented the Patarkatsishvili family from taking control of Badri's Georgian assets, including Rustavi. In December 2008, Inna Gudavadze launched an international arbitration claim against the Georgian Government, seeking the return of Rustavi and other assets including the TV station Imedi that had been seized by President Mikhail Saakashvili's government.

In July 2011, the Patarkatsishvili family reached a settlement with the government that saw the return of Rustavi to the family.

Rustavi was subsequently sold and is now managed by Hunnewell Partners.

References

External links 
 Rustavi Steel website

Steel companies of the Georgian Soviet Socialist Republic
Manufacturing companies of Georgia (country)
Manufacturing companies established in 1948
1940s establishments in Georgia (country)
1948 establishments in the Soviet Union
Rustavi
Brands of Georgia (country)